Shau Kei Wan Road, formerly known as Shaukiwan Road, is the main road in Shau Kei Wan and Sai Wan Ho, Hong Kong.

History
The road was originally a main road lying on the north coast of Hong Kong Island from Causeway Bay to Shau Kei Wan, passing through North Point, Tsat Tsz Mui and Quarry Bay.

In 1935, the section between the east end of Causeway Road in Causeway Bay and Tai Kat Street near the East Gate of Taikoo Dockyard (present-day Taikoo Shing) was renamed to King's Road for the silver jubilee of the ascendent of George V of the United Kingdom. At the same time, the section from the junction of Causeway Road and King's Road to Power Street was renamed as Electric Road while the section between King's Road and Electric Road was renamed Tung Lo Wan Road.

Features
The road is shared by Hong Kong Tramways tram tracks.

See also
 List of streets and roads in Hong Kong

References

External links

Google Maps of Shau Kei Wan Road

 

Sai Wan Ho
Shau Kei Wan
Roads on Hong Kong Island